Mayfield is a north-western suburb of Newcastle, New South Wales, which takes its name from Ada May (born 1874) a daughter of the landowner there, John Scholey. Its boundaries are the Hunter River to the north, the Main Northern railway line to the south (Waratah station), the railway line to Newcastle Harbour to the east, and open ground to the west.

Aboriginal history 
The Awabakal people are acknowledged as the descendants of the traditional custodians of the land where Mayfield is now located. Material evidence of Aboriginal occupation of the land now known as Mayfield was originally discovered by Daniel F. Cooksey in June 1925. He had located the first specimen of an Elouera, and other stone tools at a number of sites located along the south arm of the Hunter River, and of the former B.H.P Steelworks. Cooksey was formerly recognized for the find by W. W. Thorpe, the ethnologist with the Australian Museum, who, in 1928 traveled to Newcastle and officially reported the find. Cooksey documented his work in news articles and personal reports now in the custody of the Archives of the University of Newcastle's Special Collections.

History 
Much of Mayfield was originally named North Waratah, and formed part of the large Municipality of Waratah (incorporated 1871), of which John Scholey was three times Mayor. In 1938 an Act of the New South Wales Parliament created a "City of Greater Newcastle", incorporating 11 municipalities into one local government area, including Waratah. Until it was subdivided by Scholey and the land put up for sale, it was largely semi-forested scrub and fields. However, St Andrew's Church at North Waratah was opened as early as 1861, and fell within the Church of England Diocese of Newcastle, New South Wales. In 1924 a new church was dedicated at St.Andrews, Mayfield, to replace the aging colonial church.

Mayfield was originally a pleasant garden suburb on the outskirts of Newcastle, and by 1901 contained a Roman Catholic monastery, and several fine Victorian mansions belonging to prominent businessmen and lawyers, including N.B. Creer (three times Mayor of Waratah).   John Scholey built "Mayfield House" for himself, and had the necessary sandstone brought from England. Charles Upfold (Soap Manufacturer) built a large mansion on a piece of land in Crebert Street, North Waratah (now called Mayfield), given to him by his friend Scholey. It was later sold to biscuit manufacturer, William Arnott who named the mansion "Arnott Holme". Arnott then sold it in 1898 to Isaac Winn, owner of the big Newcastle department store. Winn renamed the mansion "Winn Court".BHP constructed, in the early 1920s, a very fine mansion in Crebert Street (named after Peter Crebert [1825-1895], an immigrant from Wiesbaden in Germany), with extensive gardens, for their General Manager. Now privately owned and named The Bella Vista, it is used as a weddings and functions centre.

Arrival of industry 

In 1896, BHP acquired land on the river shore at Mayfield East for smelters, and in 1910 it was decided that they would construct here a major steel works and foundries, with a 350-ton blast furnace and three 65-ton open hearth steel furnaces, a bloom mill and heavy rail mill, with by-product coke ovens to supply coke for the blast furnaces. The advantages of the site played a major part in this decision: for transport both rail and shipping already existed, and they had close proximity to the Newcastle and South Maitland coalfields, (the coal consumption in 1947 was 30,000 tons each week). Altogether the company acquired . The blast furnace commenced operations in March 1915.

Other industries followed, such as galvanized iron manufacturers John Lysaght & Co., (1921), Rylands Bros (wire, nails, rivets, bolts, springs etc.), tubemakers Stewarts & Lloyds (1934), and the Newcastle Chemical Co, (1940), and sited themselves adjacent to the steel works. The result was pollution which began to affect Mayfield which lost its fashionable status. The housing erected during and after World War I was overwhelmingly for those with employment in the heavy industries. A large proportion of the Steel Works closed down in September 1999 which had a knock on effect with adjacent industries, several of whom were now struggling with developing world markets. The remaining steel mills (Australian Tube Mills, Newcastle Wire Mill and Rod Mill) remain in operation to this day under the Liberty Steel umbrella.

Gallery

References 

General
 The B.H.P. Review - Jubilee Number, Melbourne, Victoria, June 1935.
 Newcastle - 150 Years, edited by Eric Lingard, Newcastle, 1947.
 The Diocese of Newcastle, by A.P.Elkin, Sydney, 1955.
 Federal Directory of Newcastle & District 1901 reprinted Newcastle, 1982,

External links 
 Basic map of Mayfield

Suburbs of Newcastle, New South Wales